Bernhard Theodore Mittemeyer (October 30, 1930 – January 25, 2023) was a United States Army lieutenant general who served as Surgeon General of the United States Army between 1981 and 1985.

Early life, education, and career
Mittemeyer was born in Paramaribo, Suriname, on October 30, 1930. At the age of 14, Mittemeyer emigrated to the United States during World War II.

While attending college at Moravian College and medical school at Temple University School of Medicine, he was deferred from the draft. However, after graduation, he was drafted into the Army in 1957. Following initial accession training, he volunteered for the airborne forces since the 101st and 82nd had liberated his home country of the Netherlands during the war. He was assigned to the 101st. After six months, he became the division surgeon for General Westmoreland.

Soon thereafter, however, Mittemeyer announced his resignation to Gen. Westmoreland.  When Gen. Westmorland inquired why he was leaving, Mittemeyer pointed out that he was not in the regular army since he was not a citizen. Westmoreland arranged his citizenship so that he could become part of the regular army.  Mittemeyer then accepted an Army urological residency. In 1968, he deployed to Vietnam, where he commanded the 326th Medical Battalion (Airmobile) from 28 July 1968 to 27 February 1969.

During his tenure as Surgeon General of the Army and working in Military District of Washington (MDW), he instituted Army Physical Fitness Test (APFT), later adopted by MDW-wide and now simply called Physical Fitness Test (PFT), a set of fitness tests including push-ups, sit-ups, and a timed two-mile run that now applies to all 85,000 military employees of MDW.

After serving as Surgeon General of the Army, he retired on February 28, 1985. He served as the chief of urological surgery at Texas Tech University Health Sciences Center, and retired on August 31, 2010.

Death 
Mittemeyer died in Lubbock, Texas, on January 25, 2023, at the age of 92.

Awards and decorations

References

1930 births
2023 deaths
United States Army generals
Surgeons General of the United States Army
Texas Tech University Health Sciences Center faculty
United States Army Medical Corps officers
Recipients of the Air Medal
Recipients of the Distinguished Flying Cross (United States)
Recipients of the Legion of Merit
People from Paramaribo
Surinamese emigrants to the United States